L.P. (also titled The Rembrandts: L.P.) is the third album by the American pop rock duo The Rembrandts. It was released on East West Records on May 23, 1995. It is the duo's highest-charting album to date, reaching No. 23 on the Billboard 200 album chart in August 1995, and has been certified platinum. The fifteenth track (which was a "hidden track" on the original album release) is "I'll Be There for You", which was used as the theme song for the popular sitcom Friends.

Track listing

Charts

Weekly charts

Year-end charts

References

The Rembrandts albums
1995 albums
East West Records albums